Mohamed Ali Houmed (born 1973) is a Djiboutian politician who has been president of the National Assembly since 2015 to 2023. He represents FRUD.

He was president of the executive committee of the African Parliamentary Union.

References 

Living people
1973 births
Place of birth missing (living people)
Members of the National Assembly (Djibouti)
Presidents of the National Assembly (Djibouti)
Front for the Restoration of Unity and Democracy politicians